The Day Mars Invaded Earth (a.k.a. Spaceraid 63) is an independently made 1963 black-and-white CinemaScope science fiction film, produced and directed by Maury Dexter, that stars Kent Taylor, Marie Windsor, and William Mims. The film was released by Twentieth Century Fox. Dexter later said the film's title came from Associated Producers' Robert L. Lippert and was meant to evoke memories of Fox's 1951 classic The Day the Earth Stood Still.

The film's storyline is a cross between George Pal's The War of the Worlds (1953), and Don Siegel's Invasion of the Body Snatchers (1956). Martian energy beings duplicate a scientist and his family as a first step toward their invasion of Earth to stop humanity's space programs.

The Day Mars Invaded Earth was released as the bottom half of a double feature with the Elvis Presley film Kissin' Cousins.

Plot
NASA successfully lands a robotic surveyor on Mars. The rover begins to explore, but after just a few minutes it is completely destroyed by what appears to be a high energy surge. At exactly the same instant back at mission control, Dr. Dave Fielding (Kent Taylor), in charge of the project, suddenly feels oddly disconnected and not himself; he shakes it off and then goes to face the crowd of expectant reporters. Right after he leaves, his exact body double is sitting at his desk.

Dave then leaves for a vacation and flies to California to be with his family; they are now staying in the guest house of a lavish mansion belonging to his wife's family. His children, 10 year-old Rocky (Gregg Shank) and teen Judi (Betty Beall), are very happy to see him, but it is very clear that his marriage to Claire (Marie Windsor) is in trouble because of the time he must spend away from his family. At first, the tensions between Dave and Claire make it less obvious that they are seeing their body doubles walking around the estate. Eventually, though, as things turn strange, the whole family suspects something is wrong and pulls together. They soon discover they are trapped, unable to leave the isolated estate due to a malfunctioning main gate.

Dave then encounters his body double in the mansion's main house. The duplicate Dave informs him that Mars is inhabited and that all Martians are beings without any physical bodies, an energy-like intelligence. They traveled to Earth via the Martian probe's high-gain, two-way radio transmitter, destroying the robotic rover in the process. Now on Earth, the Martians plan to replace key humans with duplicates to quash any further Earth missions to Mars. Since Dave's wife and children would likely recognize a duplicate, they had to be replaced, too. Family friend Web (William Mims) comes by later and finally gets the main gate open, but on his way back, the Martian-Dave reduces Web to ash.

Later, "Dave and his family" appear to get into a car and leave the estate, with a Martian-Web duplicate behind the wheel. As they drive past the estate's empty swimming pool, five distinct body shapes of piled ash can be seen on the concrete bottom. The pool's water jets then turn on, slowly washing the ashes away.

Cast
 Kent Taylor as Dr. David Fielding
 Marie Windsor as Claire Fielding
 William Mims as Dr. Web Spencer
 Betty Beall as Judi Fielding
 Lowell Brown as Frank Hazard
 Gregg Shank as Rocky Fielding
 Henrietta Moore as Mrs. Moore
 Troy Melton as Police Officer
 George Riley as Cab Driver

Production
The Day Mars Invaded Earth was shot at the historic Greystone Mansion. It was the second script ever written by Harry Spalding.

Director Dexter said that Robert L. Lippert insisted that Marie Windsor be cast in the film.

Reception
The Day Mars Invaded Earth was reviewed in The New York Times: "This pallid, pint-sized exercise starts out with a scientist and his little family vacationing on a huge California estate after he has supervised a rocket landing on Mars. At least, we're told he has. Then the family begins seeing spots and double images, to spook music. This took 40 minutes, before one viewer came back to earth, retreating. The picture also traditionally wastes one of Hollywood's low-budget queens, the gifted Marie Windsor".

Maury Dexter called it "a nice little film".

Home video
The Day Mars Invaded Earth was released on DVD March 19, 2015 by Fox Cinema Archives. Originally shot and released in CinemaScope (2:35:1), the DVD's transfer was instead made from a letterboxed 4:3 master, rather than from a high-definition or standard definition 16:9 widescreen master.

See also
 List of American films of 1963

References

Notes

Bibliography

 Weaver, Tom. I Talked with a Zombie: Interviews with 23 Veterans of Horror and Sci-Fi Films and Television. Jefferson, North Carolina: McFarland & Company, 2014. .

External links
 
 
 
 

1963 films
1960s English-language films
1960s science fiction films
20th Century Fox films
CinemaScope films
Alien invasions in films
American science fiction films
American black-and-white films
Films directed by Maury Dexter
Films scored by Richard LaSalle
Mars in film
1960s American films